The 1961–62 season was Chelsea Football Club's forty-eighth competitive season. Following a poor start to the season, manager Ted Drake was dismissed in September 1961 and replaced by player-coach Tommy Docherty. Nevertheless, the club were relegated at the season of the season, ending a 32-year spell in the top-flight.

Table

References

External links
 1961–62 season at stamford-bridge.com

1961–62
English football clubs 1961–62 season